The UEFA Europa League (abbreviated as UEL, or sometimes, UEFA EL) is an annual football club competition organised since 1971 by the Union of European Football Associations (UEFA) for eligible European football clubs. It is the second-tier competition of European club football, ranking below the UEFA Champions League and above the UEFA Europa Conference League.

Introduced in 1971 as the UEFA Cup, it replaced the Inter-Cities Fairs Cup. The UEFA Cup was the third-tier competition from 1971 to 1999 before the UEFA Cup Winners' Cup was discontinued, and it is still often referred to as the “C3” in reference to this. Clubs qualify for the competition based on their performance in their national leagues and cup competitions.

In 1999, the UEFA Cup Winners' Cup was merged with the UEFA Cup and discontinued as a separate competition. From the 2004–05 season a group stage was added before the knockout phase. The competition took on its current name in 2009, following a change in format. The 2009 re-branding included a merge with the UEFA Intertoto Cup, producing an enlarged competition format, with an expanded group stage and a change in qualifying criteria. The winner of the UEFA Europa League qualifies for the UEFA Super Cup and, since the 2014–15 season, qualifies for the following season's UEFA Champions League, entering at the group stage.

Spanish clubs have the highest number of victories (13 wins), followed by teams from England and Italy (9 wins each). The title has been won by 29 clubs, 14 of which have won it more than once. The most successful club in the competition is Sevilla, with six titles. Eintracht Frankfurt are the reigning champions, having beaten Rangers 5–4 on penalties in the 2022 final.

History
The UEFA Cup was preceded by the Inter-Cities Fairs Cup, which was a European football competition played between 1955 and 1971. The competition grew from 11 teams during the first edition (1955–58) to 64 teams by the last edition which was played in 1970–71. It was replaced by the UEFA Cup, a new seasonal confederation competition which has a different regulation, format and disciplinary committee.

The UEFA Cup was first played in the 1971–72 season, and ended with an all-English final between Wolverhampton Wanderers and Tottenham Hotspur, with Spurs taking the first honours. The competition has since gained greater prestige and interest from the mass media than the Fairs Cup. The title was retained by another English club, Liverpool, in 1973, who defeated Borussia Mönchengladbach in the final. Gladbach won the competition in 1975 and 1979, and reached the final in 1980. Feyenoord won the cup in 1974 after defeating Tottenham Hotspur 4–2 on aggregate (2–2 in London, 2–0 in Rotterdam). Liverpool won the competition for the second time in 1976 after defeating Club Brugge in the final.

During the 1980s, IFK Göteborg (1982 and 1987) and Real Madrid (1985 and 1986) won the competition twice each, with Anderlecht reaching two consecutive finals, winning in 1983 and losing to Tottenham Hotspur in 1984. 1989 saw the commencement of the Italian clubs' domination, when Diego Maradona's Napoli defeated VfB Stuttgart. The 1990s started with two all-Italian finals, and in 1992, Torino lost the final to Ajax on the away goals rule. Juventus won the competition for a third time in 1993. Internazionale kept the cup in Italy in 1994.

1995 saw a third all-Italian final, with Parma proving their consistency, after two consecutive Cup Winners' Cup finals. The only final with no Italians in the 1990s was in 1996. Internazionale reached the final the following two years, losing in 1997 to Schalke 04 on penalties, and winning another all-Italian final in 1998, taking home the cup for the third time in only eight years. Parma won the cup in 1999, the last win of the Italian-domination era. It was the last UEFA Cup/Europa League final appearance for any Italian club until Internazionale reached the 2020 final.

The era of the 2000s began with victory for Galatasaray, the first Turkish team to win the trophy. Liverpool won the competition for the third time in 2001. In 2002, Feyenoord became winners for the second time, defeating Borussia Dortmund. Porto triumphed in the 2003 and 2011 tournaments, with the latter victory against fellow Portuguese side Braga.

In 2004, the cup returned to Spain with Valencia being victorious. CSKA Moscow won in 2005. Sevilla succeeded on two consecutive occasions in 2006 and 2007, the latter in a final against fellow Spaniards Espanyol. Zenit Saint Petersburg won in 2008. Ukraine's Shakhtar Donetsk, won in 2009, the first Ukrainian side to do so.

Atlético Madrid won twice in three seasons, in 2010 and 2012, the latter in another all-Spanish final between them and Athletic Bilbao. In 2013, Chelsea became the first Champions League holders to win the UEFA Cup/Europa League the following year. In 2014, Sevilla won their third cup in eight years after defeating Benfica on penalties. In 2015, Sevilla won their fourth UEFA Cup/Europa League and, in an unprecedented feat, they defended their title a third year in a row beating Liverpool in the 2016 final, making them the most successful team in the history of the competition with five titles. They added a sixth victory in 2020, after defeating Inter Milan. The 2019 all London final between Chelsea and Arsenal was the first UEFA Cup/Europa League final between two teams from the same city.

Since the 2009–10 season, the competition was rebranded as the UEFA Europa League. At the same time, the UEFA Intertoto Cup, UEFA's third-tier competition, was discontinued and merged into the new Europa League.

Trophy
The UEFA Cup, also known as the Coupe UEFA, is the trophy awarded annually by UEFA to the football club that wins the UEFA Europa League. Before the 2009–10 season, both the competition and the trophy were known as the 'UEFA Cup'.

Before the competition was renamed the UEFA Europa League in the 2009–10 season, the UEFA regulations stated that a club could keep the original trophy for a year before returning it to UEFA. After its return, the club could keep a four-fifths scale replica of the original trophy. Upon their third consecutive win or fifth win overall, a club could retain the trophy permanently.

Under the new regulations, the trophy remains in UEFA's keeping at all times. A full-size replica trophy is awarded to each winner of the competition. A club that wins three consecutive times or five times overall will receive a multiple-winner badge. As of 2016–17, only Sevilla has earned the honour to wear the multiple-winner badge, having achieved both prerequired feats in 2016.

The trophy was designed and crafted by Silvio Gazzaniga, who also designed the FIFA World Cup Trophy, working for Bertoni, for the 1972 UEFA Cup Final. It weighs  and is silver on a yellow marble plinth.  tall, the cup is formed by a base with two onyx discs in which a band with the flags of the UEFA member nations is inserted. The lower part of the sculpture symbolises the stylised footballers and is surmounted by a hand-embossed slab.

Anthem

A musical theme for the competition, the Anthem, is played before every Europa League game at a stadium hosting such an event and before every television broadcast of a Europa League game as a musical element of the competition's opening sequence.

The competition's first anthem was composed by Yohann Zveig and recorded by the Paris Opera in early 2009. The theme for the re-branded UEFA Cup competition was first officially unveiled at the Grimaldi Forum on 28 August 2009 before the 2009–10 season group stage draw. A new anthem was composed by Michael Kadelbach and recorded in Berlin and was launched as part of the competition's rebranding at the start of the 2015–16 season.

A new anthem created by MassiveMusic was composed for the start of the 2018–19 season. It also can be heard at the start of UEFA Europa Conference League matches.

Format

Qualification

Qualification for the competition is based on UEFA coefficients, with better entrance rounds being offered to the more successful nations. In practice, each association has a standard number of three berths, except:
 Nations ranked 52 and 53 (Andorra and San Marino in the 2013–14 season), which have two berths
 The nation ranked 54 (Gibraltar in the 2014–15 season) which has one berth.
 Liechtenstein, which qualifies only the Cup winners

Usually, each country's places are awarded to teams who finish in various runners-up places in its top-flight league and the winner of the main cup competition. Typically the teams qualifying via the league are those in the highest places not eligible for the UEFA Champions League; however, the Belgian league awards one place via a playoff between First A and First B teams. Before its discontinuation in 2020–21, France offered a place to the winners of the Coupe de la Ligue.

A team may qualify for European competitions through more than one route. In all cases, if a club is eligible to enter the UEFA Champions League then the Champions League place takes precedence and the club does not enter the UEFA Europa League. The UEFA Europa League place is then granted to another club or vacated if the maximum limit of teams qualifying for European competitions is exceeded. If a team qualifies for European competition through both winning a cup and league placing, the "spare" UEFA Europa League place will go to the highest placed league team which has not already qualified for European competition, depending on the rules of the national association, or vacated, if the described limit is reached.

The top three ranked associations may qualify for the fourth berth if both the Champions League and Europa League champions are from that association and do not qualify for European competition through their domestic performance. In that case, the fourth-placed team in that association will join the Europa League instead of the Champions League, in addition to their other qualifying teams.

More recently, clubs that are knocked out of the qualifying round and the group stage of the Champions League can also join the UEFA Europa League, at different stages (see below). Formerly, the reigning champions qualified to defend their title, but since 2015 they qualify for the Champions League. From 1995 to 2015, three leagues gained one extra place via the UEFA Respect Fair Play ranking.

Background
UEFA coefficients were introduced in 1980 and, until 1999, they gave a greater number of berths in UEFA Cup to the more successful nations. Three nations had four places, five nations had three places, thirteen nations had two places, and eleven nations only one place. Since 1998, a similar system has been used for the UEFA Champions League. Before 1980, the entrance criteria of the last Fairs Cup was used.

Historical formats
The competition was traditionally a pure knockout tournament. All ties were two-legged, including the final. Starting with the 1997–98 season, the final became a one-off match, but all other ties remained two-legged.

Before the 2004–05 season, the tournament consisted of one qualifying round, followed by a series of knockout rounds. The sixteen non-qualifiers from the final qualifying round of the Champions League entered at the first round proper; later in the tournament, the survivors were joined by third-place finishers from the (first) group phase of the Champions League.

From the 2004–05 season, the competition started with two knockout qualifying rounds held in July and August. Participants from associations ranked 18 and lower entered the first qualifying round with those from associations ranked 9–18 joining them in the second qualifying round. In addition, three places in the first qualifying round were reserved for the UEFA Fair Play ranking winners (until 2015–16), and eleven places in the second qualifying round for the UEFA Intertoto Cup winners.

Winners of the qualifying rounds then joined teams from the associations ranked 1–13 in the first round proper. In addition, non-qualifiers in the third qualifying round of the Champions League also joined the competition at this point along with the current title-holders (unless they had qualified for the Champions League via their national league), for a total of 80 teams in the first round.

After the first knockout round, the 40 survivors entered a group phase, with the clubs being drawn into eight groups of five each. Unlike the Champions League group phase, the UEFA Cup group phase was played in a single round-robin format, with each club playing two home and two away games. The top three teams in each of the eight groups qualified for the main knockout round along with the eight third-placed teams in the Champions League group phase. From then on a series of two-legged knockout ties were played before a single-legged final, traditionally held on a Wednesday in May, exactly one week before the Champions League final.

Current format

In the 2009–10 season, the competition was rebranded as the UEFA Europa League to raise its profile. Eight more teams qualified for the group stage, which consisted of 12 groups with four teams each (in a double round-robin); the top two teams in each group advanced. The competition was then similar to the previous format, with four rounds of two-legged knockout rounds and a one-off final held at a neutral ground which met UEFA's Category Four stadium criteria. The final was played in May, on the Wednesday ten days before the Champions League final.

Qualification changed significantly. Associations ranked 7–9 in the UEFA coefficients sent the cup winners and three (two since the 2015–16 season) other teams to the UEFA Europa League qualification; all other nations sent a cup winner and two other teams, except for Andorra and San Marino (who sent a cup winner and a runner-up) and Liechtenstein (who sent only a cup winner). Since Gibraltar was accepted as a full UEFA member at the 24 May 2013 UEFA Congress in London, their cup winner also qualified for the Europa League.

Although the other teams will be the next-highest-ranked clubs in each domestic league (after those qualifying for the UEFA Champions League), France and England will continue to use one spot for their league-cup winners. With the abolition of the Intertoto Cup, all participants in the Europa League are qualified through domestic routes. The higher an association is ranked in the UEFA coefficients, the later its clubs generally begin the qualification. However, every team except for the title-holder (until the 2014–15 season) and the highest-ranked teams (usually the cup winner or the best Europa League-qualified team) from the top (six from 2012 to 2015, 12 since the 2015–16 season) associations had to play at least one qualification round.

Except for the teams mentioned, all teams eliminated in the Champions League preliminary round, qualifying rounds and play-off round are transferred to the Europa League. The 12 winners and the 12 runners-up in the group stage advance to the knockout round with eight third-place teams from the Champions League group stage.

The distribution was changed in 2014 to broaden the competition's appeal, giving the Europa League champions a Champions League qualification berth; more teams automatically qualify for the group stage. If cup winners had already qualified for European competition through league performance, their place in the league is vacated and goes to the best-ranked teams not qualified for European competition; the cup runner-up is no longer qualified through the cup berth. These rules became effective for the 2015–16 season.

Distribution (from 2015–16 to 2017–18)

The access list above is provisional, as changes will need to be made in the following cases:
 If the Champions League title holders or the Europa League title holders have qualified for the Europa League through domestic performance, their berth in the Europa League is vacated (not replaced by another team from the same association), and cup winners of the highest-ranked associations are moved to a later round accordingly.
 In some cases where changes to the access list of the Champions League are made, the number of losers of the Champions League third qualifying round which are transferred to the Europa League is increased or decreased from the default number of 15, which means changes to the access list of the Europa League will also need to be made.
 Because a maximum of five teams from one association can enter the UEFA Champions League, if both the Champions League title holders and the Europa League title holders are from the same top three ranked association and finish outside the top four of their domestic league, the fourth-placed team of their association will be moved to the Europa League and enter the group stage, which means changes to the access list of the Europa League may also need to be made.

Distribution (from 2018–19 to 2020–21)
Beginning with the 2018–19 tournament, all domestic champions eliminated in the qualifying rounds of the UEFA Champions League will transfer to the Europa League, rather than just teams that are eliminated in the third-qualifying and play-off rounds. Europa League qualifying will also provide a separate champions route for these teams, allowing more opportunities for domestic league champions to compete against each other.

Distribution (from 2021–22 to 2023–24)
The announcement of the UEFA Europa Conference League, a tertiary competition which would serve to split off the lower-ranked teams in the Europa League to give them a greater chance to compete, included a document from UEFA listing their intentions for qualification to the Europa League from 2021 onwards. With a majority of the former entrants into the Europa League now participating solely in the UECL, the Europa League itself would have a greatly reduced format which will focus primarily around its group stage. There would also be an additional knockout round before the knockout phase proper, allowing for third-placed teams in the Champions League group stage to fall into the Europa League while still keeping the knockout stage itself at only 16 teams total.

Distribution (from 2024–25)

Prize money
Similar to the UEFA Champions League, the prize money received by the clubs is divided into fixed payments based on participation and results, and variable amounts that depend of the value of their TV market.

For the 2021–22 season, group stage participation in the Europa League awarded a base fee of €3,630,000. A victory in the group pays €630,000 and a draw €210,000. Each group winner earns €1,100,000 and each runner-up €550,000. Reaching the knock-out stage triggers additional bonuses: €500,000 for the round of 32, €1,200,000 for the round of 16, €1,800,000 for the quarter-finals and €2,800,000 for the semi-finals. The losing finalists receive €4,600,000 and the champions receive €8,600,000.
 Qualified to group stage: €3,630,000
 Match won in group stage: €630,000
 Match drawn in group stage: €210,000
 1st in group stage: €1,100,000
 2nd in group stage: €550,000
 Knockout round play-offs: €500,000
 Round of 16: €1,200,000
 Quarter-final: €1,800,000
 Semi-final: €2,800,000
 Runner-up: €4,600,000
 Champion: €8,600,000

Sponsorship
The UEFA Europa League is sponsored by seven multinational corporations, which share the same partners with the UEFA Europa Conference League.

The tournament's main sponsors for the 2021–24 cycle are:

 Heineken N.V.
 Heineken – Heineken 0.0 (except Albania, Azerbaijan, Bosnia and Herzegovina, France, Kazakhstan, Kosovo, Norway and Turkey)
 Just Eat Takeaway
 10bis (Israel only)
Bistro (Slovakia only)
Just Eat (Croatia, Denmark, France, Ireland, Italy, Serbia, Spain, Switzerland and the United Kingdom only)
 Lieferando (Germany and Austria only)
 Grubhub (United States only)
 SkipTheDishes (Canada only)
 Pyszne (Poland only)
 Takeaway (Belgium, Bulgaria, Luxembourg and Romania only)
 Thuisbezorgd (Netherlands only)
 Hankook Tire
 Laufenn
 Engelbert Strauss
 Enterprise Rent-A-Car
 Swissquote
 Bwin (except Albania, Azerbaijan, Bosnia and Herzegovina, Kazakhstan, Kosovo, Spain and Turkey) 
 Entain Foundation
Socios.com (United States only)

Molten is a secondary sponsor and supplies the official match ball. Since the inception of Europa League brand, the tournament has used its own hoardings (in that year it debuted in the round of 32) like UEFA Champions League. LED hoardings made their debut in the 2012–13 final and appeared in the 2015–16 season from the round of 16. In the same season, from the group stage, teams are not allowed to show their sponsors. It appeared in the 2018–19 season for selected matches in the group stages and the round of 32.

Individual clubs may wear jerseys with advertising, even if such sponsors conflict with those of the Europa League. Two sponsorships are permitted per jersey (plus that of the manufacturer), at the chest and the left sleeve. Exceptions are made for non-profit organisations, which can feature on the front of the shirt, incorporated with the main sponsor, or on the back, either below the squad number or between the player name and the collar.

Records and statistics

The UEFA Cup finals were played over two legs until 1997. The first final, between Wolverhampton Wanderers and Tottenham Hotspur, was played on 3 May 1972 in Wolverhampton and 17 May 1972 in London. The first leg was won 2–1 by Tottenham Hotspur. The second leg ended in a 1–1 draw, meaning that Tottenham Hotspur became the first UEFA Cup winners.

The one-match finals in pre-selected venues were introduced in 1998. A venue must meet or exceed UEFA Category three standards to host UEFA Cup finals. On two occasions, the final was played at a finalist's home ground: Feyenoord defeated Borussia Dortmund at De Kuip, Rotterdam, in 2002, and Sporting CP lost to CSKA Moscow at their own Estádio José Alvalade, Lisbon, in 2005.

The last UEFA Cup final before it was rebranded as the UEFA Europa League was held at the Şükrü Saracoğlu Stadium in Istanbul on 20 May 2009, when Shakhtar Donetsk of Ukraine beat Werder Bremen of Germany 2–1 after extra time.

The first final of the rebranded Europa League was played in 2010, when Atlético Madrid of Spain beat Fulham of England 2–1 after extra time.

Performances by club

Performances by nation

Notes

 A  Includes West Germany clubs, no East Germany clubs appeared in a final.

Awards
Starting from the 2016–17 edition of the competition, UEFA introduced the UEFA Europa League Player of the Season award.

The jury is composed of the coaches of the clubs which participate in the group stage of the competition, together with 55 journalists selected by the European Sports Media (ESM) group, one from each UEFA member association.

Winners

Starting from the 2021–22 edition of the competition, UEFA introduced the UEFA Europa League Young Player of the Season award, chosen by UEFA's Technical Observer Panel.

Winners

See also
 List of association football competitions

Notes

References

External links

  
 UEFA Europa League – History (archived)
 UEFA Cup/UEFA Europa League – History

 
Europa League
1971 establishments in Europe
2
Multi-national professional sports leagues
Recurring sporting events established in 1971